Isler or İşler may refer to:

 Alan Isler, American novelist and educator
 Connie Isler, American golfer
 Cenk İşler, Turkish footballer
 Donald Isler, American pianist and music educator
 Heinz Isler, Swiss structural engineer famous for thin-shell structures 
 J. J. Isler, American yachtswoman
 Gabriela Isler, Miss Venezuela 2012 and Miss Universe 2013
 Marie Anne Isler Béguin, French politician
 Nejat İşler, Turkish actor
 Samantha Isler, American actress

See also
 Organize İşler, Turkish satirical black comedy movie

English-language surnames
Turkish-language surnames